Jalan Seremban-Labu-Nilai, Federal Route 362 (formerly Negeri Sembilan State Route N38), is a federal road in Negeri Sembilan, Malaysia. Prior to the North-South Expressway, this road was the main road connecting Nilai to Seremban. Even with the expressway, this road is still the main route serving Labu and Tiroi and Bandar Ainsdale.

The Kilometre Zero is located at Seremban.

At most sections, the Federal Route 362 was built under the JKR R5 road standard, with a speed limit of 90 km/h.

List of junctions

References

Malaysian Federal Roads